San Niccolò may refer to:

 San Niccolò Oltrarno, a Roman Catholic church in Florence, Tuscany, Italy
 San Niccolò, Osimo, a Roman Catholic church in Osimo, in the province of Ancona, Marche, Italy
 San Niccolò di Celle, a frazione of Deruta in the Province of Perugia, Umbria, Italy
 San Niccolò al Carmine, Siena, a Roman Catholic church and monastery in Tuscany, Italy

See also
 San Nicolò (disambiguation)
 Niccolò (disambiguation)